A Better Tomorrow 2 is a 1987 Hong Kong action film written and directed by John Woo. A follow-up to its popular predecessor, A Better Tomorrow, the film stars returning cast members Chow Yun-fat, Ti Lung and Leslie Cheung alongside new cast member Dean Shek. The film was released in Hong Kong on 17 December 1987.

Due to the popularity of Chow's break-out performance in the previous instalment, he was cast in a new character as the twin brother of "Mark", who was killed in the previous film. A Better Tomorrow 2 is known for its over the top violence, exaggerated blood and gore, and body counts nearing the hundreds.

Film director John Woo and producer Tsui Hark had disagreements over the focus of this film. Tsui felt that the film should focus more on Dean Shek's character. This led to the film being edited by both Tsui and Woo. Their disagreements would lead to a split after this film, with Hark directing A Better Tomorrow 3 and Woo moving on to create The Killer.

Plot
Several years after his arrest, Sung Tse-ho is offered early parole by the police in exchange for spying on his former boss and mentor, Lung Sei, who is suspected of heading a counterfeiting operation. Inspector Wu, the leader of the task force, wants to mark his retirement with the capture of a high profile criminal like Lung.

Though Ho initially declines because of his loyalty to Lung, he eventually changes his mind when he discovers that his younger brother, Kit, who is expecting a child along with his pregnant wife Jackie, is working undercover on the same case. While working the case, the two brothers meet and agree to work together.

After being framed for murder, Lung seeks Ho's help, who is able to help him escape to New York. However, Lung suffers a psychotic break and is institutionalized after receiving news of his daughter's murder and witnessing the death of a friend.

Meanwhile, Ho learns that his deceased friend Mark Lee has a long-lost twin brother, Ken, a former gang member who left Hong Kong as a teenager to travel across America, eventually opening a restaurant in New York City. Ho then locates Ken and enlists his assistance in freeing Lung.

Targeted by both assassins attempting to kill Lung as well as American mobsters looking to extort Ken, Ken and a catatonic Lung take refuge in an apartment building where Ken arms himself. During a shoot-out with their attackers, Ken and Lung find themselves cornered; seeing Ken in trouble snaps Lung out of his stupor, and he kills the last of their pursuers.

The two return to Hong Kong and regroup with Ho and Kit. The group discovers that one of Lung's employees, Ko Ying-pui, is responsible for attempt on Lung's life and has since taken over the organization in Lung's absence. Lung decides that he would rather destroy his organization with his own hands than let it fall into dishonor and ruin, and the group starts planning to act against Ko.

After scouting out Ko's mansion alone, Kit is fatally wounded, but is rescued by Ken, who attempts to rush him to the hospital. Knowing that he will not make it however, Kit persuades Ken to stop at a phone booth to call Jackie, where he manages to name his newborn child Sung Ho-yin ("the Spirit of Righteousness") before succumbing to his wounds.

After attending Kit's funeral, Ho, Ken, and Lung take revenge on Ko by attacking his mansion during a meeting with a counterfeiting client. The three manage to kill Ko and several of his men following an intense shootout, but are all critically wounded in the process. Following the shootout, the three men sit down in the mansion and are surrounded by the police forces led by Inspector Wu. Upon seeing the condition of the men, Wu orders his men to stand down, while Ho remarks against Inspector Wu's retirement, as there is "much work left for [him] to do."

Cast
Dean Shek as Lung Sei
Chow Yun-fat as Ken "Gor" Lee
Ti Lung as Sung Tse-ho
Leslie Cheung as Sung Tse-kit
Emily Chu as Jackie Sung (Tse-kit's wife)
Kwan Shan as Ko Ying-pui (The main antagonist)
Kenneth Tsang as Ken (The taxi manager from the first film)
Shing Fui-On as Ko's partner
Lam Chung as Ko's partner
Ng Man-tat as Mr Wong (during the early stage of his film career)
Peter Wang as Sam (Lung's priest friend in New York)
Lung Ming-yan as Chong (Ko's cold blooded hitman)
Louis Roth as Protection Money Collector
Regina Kent as Peggy Lung (Lung's daughter)
Ken Boyle as New York Counterfeit Buyer
Lau Siu-ming as Chief Inspector Wu
Mike Abbott as Assassin
Cindy Lau as Ken's restaurant staff
Steve Mak as Ko's thug

Music

Theme song
"Will Rush Toward Future Day" (奔向未來日子)
Lyrics: Wong Jim
Composition and Arrangement: Joseph Koo
Performance: Leslie Cheung

Music cues
This film contains music cues from other films:
"Birdy's Flight (From 'Not One of Us')"
Composer: Peter Gabriel
From: Birdy (1984)
"Leo Gets It"
Composer: Gary Chang
From: 52 Pick-Up (1987)
"The Set-Up"
Composer: Jerry Goldsmith
From: Extreme Prejudice (1987)

Release
The film was theatrically released in Hong Kong on 17 December 1987. In the Philippines, the film was released by First Films as Rapid Fire on 25 August 1988, with free sunglasses, jackets, and watches distributed on opening day.

Anchor Bay Entertainment released the film on DVD in the US in January 2001. Extras include the trailer and biographies. In June 2004, HKflix.com released it again on DVD along with its two sequels in a boxed set. Hong Kong Legends released a special collector's edition in the UK in September 2006.

Reception
Rotten Tomatoes, a review aggregator, reports that 83% of six surveyed critics gave the film a positive review; the average rating was 7/10. Writing in Sex and Zen & A Bullet in the Head, Stefan Hammond and Mike Wilkins describe the film as "gorged with Woo's trademarks" and "a funhouse exaggeration of its central motifs".

Accolades

See also
Chow Yun-fat filmography
List of Hong Kong films of 1987
List of Hong Kong films

References

External links

1987 films
1987 action films
1980s crime action films
1980s crime drama films
1980s Cantonese-language films
Films directed by John Woo
Films set in Hong Kong
Films set in New York City
Films shot in Hong Kong
Films shot in New York City
Gun fu films
A Better Tomorrow films
Hong Kong crime action films
Hong Kong sequel films
Hong Kong New Wave films
Triad films
1987 drama films
1980s Hong Kong films